Nicholas II (died after 1213) was a Hungarian distinguished nobleman, who served as voivode of Transylvania in 1213, during the reign of Andrew II of Hungary.

Before his voivodeship, Nicholas II served as ispán (comes) of Csanád (1206), Bihar (1207, 1209) and Újvár Counties (1212). Nicholas II maybe was the same person as Nicholas from the kindred Csák, who functioned as ispán of several counties in the coming decades.

References

Sources
 Engel, Pál (2001). The Realm of St Stephen: A History of Medieval Hungary, 895-1526. I.B. Tauris Publishers. .
  Markó, László (2006). A magyar állam főméltóságai Szent Istvántól napjainkig – Életrajzi Lexikon ("The High Officers of the Hungarian State from Saint Stephen to the Present Days – A Biographical Encyclopedia") (2nd edition); Helikon Kiadó Kft., Budapest; .
  Zsoldos, Attila (2011). Magyarország világi archontológiája, 1000–1301 ("Secular Archontology of Hungary, 1000–1301"). História, MTA Történettudományi Intézete. Budapest. 

Voivodes of Transylvania
Medieval Transylvanian people
12th-century Hungarian people
13th-century Hungarian people